is a Japanese footballer who plays for Austrian Football Bundesliga club LASK. He plays either as an attacking midfielder or a forward.

Club career
Nakamura joined Gamba Osaka from Kantō Soccer League side Mitsubishi Yowa ahead of the 2018 J1 League season.   He made his senior debut at the age of 17 on 24 February 2018 in a 3–2 home defeat by Nagoya Grampus in which replaced Hwang Ui-jo in the 69th minute and 10 minutes later crossed for Shun Nagasawa to head home and make the score 2-2.

In total he played 17 J1 League games during his debut campaign and netted 1 goal, the winner in a 2–1 win over V-Varen Nagasaki on November 24. He also scored once in 7 J.League Cup games and made one substitute appearance in the Emperor's Cup, a shock home defeat to Kwansei Gakuin University.

Nakamura spent a large part of the second half of the season with Gamba's Under-23 side in J3 League where he netted 4 times in 15 appearances with the goals coming against FC Tokyo U-23, Thespakusatsu Gunma and Azul Claro Numazu.

In February 2021, Nakamura has loaned to 2. Liga (Austria) club FC Juniors OÖ.

On 11 August 2021, he signed a three-year contract with Austrian club LASK.

International career
Nakamura has represented Japan at Under-15, Under-16 and Under-17 level playing in both the AFC Under-16 Championship in 2016, and the 2017 FIFA U-17 World Cup in which he netted 4 times in 4 games before Japan were eliminated by England at the last-16 stage.

Career statistics
Last update: 15 May 2021

References

External links

2000 births
Living people
People from Abiko, Chiba
Association football people from Chiba Prefecture
Japanese footballers
Japan youth international footballers
Association football forwards
Gamba Osaka players
Gamba Osaka U-23 players
FC Twente players
Sint-Truidense V.V. players
FC Juniors OÖ players
LASK players
J1 League players
J3 League players
Eredivisie players
Belgian Pro League players
2. Liga (Austria) players
Austrian Football Bundesliga players
Japanese expatriate footballers
Expatriate footballers in the Netherlands
Japanese expatriate sportspeople in the Netherlands
Expatriate footballers in Austria
Japanese expatriate sportspeople in Austria
Japan under-20 international footballers